Up All Night is the first full-length album by Pajama Party, an American R&B/Dance/Pop female vocal trio from Brooklyn, New York. The album was released on October 23, 1989 by Atlantic Records.

Track listing

CD Edition

Charts
Singles - Billboard (North America)

External links
 [ Allmusic.com entry]
 My Space Official Page

1989 albums
Pajama Party (group) albums